El Moustapha Diaw (born 31 December 1996) is a footballer from Mauritania. He currently plays for FC Nouadhibou and the Mauritania national football team. Besides Mauritania, he has played in Oman, Bahrain, and Belarus.

Career

Fanja SC
Loaned to Oman Professional League side Fanja SC for four months, Diaw lifted the 2015-16 Oman Professional League trophy with the club, earning the man-of-the-match award in the last round of the season.

The Moroccan media spread rumors that KAC Kénitra of the Botola Pro offered to buy the youngster from ASAC Concorde in 2015 but negotiations failed on the transfer.

In 2019, he signed for Dnyapro Mogilev.

In 2021, he signed for Manama Club.

He is a Mauritania international.

During a 2016 game against Tunisia, Diaw was involved in a fight with winger Wahbi Khazri, who retaliated by hitting the Mauritanian in right side of his face. Both players were given red cards. Following the friendly, national team coach Corentin Martins excluded the defender for his behavior on the pitch, holding several meetings with the player to discipline and harangue him about his actions.

International goals
Scores and results list Mauritania's goal tally first.

References

External links

1996 births
Living people
People from Nouakchott
Mauritanian footballers
Association football defenders
Mauritania international footballers
2019 Africa Cup of Nations players
Mauritanian expatriate footballers
Expatriate footballers in Oman
Expatriate footballers in Belarus
Oman Professional League players
Fanja SC players
FC Tevragh-Zeina players
FC Dnyapro Mogilev players
FC Nouadhibou players
Mauritania A' international footballers
2018 African Nations Championship players
Mauritanian expatriate sportspeople in Belarus
Mauritanian expatriate sportspeople in Oman